The China Stamp Society is a philatelic organization dedicated to the appreciation of the postage stamps and postal history of China, including the Treaty Ports, Foreign Offices in China, the Japanese Occupation, Hong Kong, Macao, Manchukuo and Tibet.

Chapters
China Stamp Society chapters in the United States are located at: San Francisco Bay, California (Chiu Chin Shan Chapter); Los Angeles, California (Chia Nan Chapter); Chicago, Illinois (Ping Yuan Zhi Zhu Chapter); Dallas - Ft. Worth Area (North Texas Chapter); and, Seattle, Washington (Chang Qing Long Chapter).

International chapters are located at: The Republic of China (Taipei Chapter), People's Republic of China (China Chapter), and Japan Chapter, Tokyo.

Convention
The national convention is held in Los Angeles, California, at the SESCAL World Series of Philately (WSP) stamp show on even-numbered years. On odd numbered years, the meeting is held in other parts of the country. The annual board of directors meeting is held at the convention. In 2009, the annual meeting was held at BALPEX in Baltimore, Maryland. The 2010 meeting is scheduled for SESCAL in Los Angeles, California, and the 2011 meeting is scheduled for CHICAGOPEX in Chicago, Illinois.

Services provided
The society provides a number of services related to China philately, including on-line stamp sales, expertizing service, identification service, translation services, discounts on books, library borrowing privileges, and scholarships for young collectors.

Membership
Membership is available to all collectors of stamps of China. Membership may be requested through the website or by mail to The China Stamp Society, Inc., P.O. Box 20711, Columbus, Ohio 43220 USA.

Publications
The China Clipper magazine is published every other month. It has been published continuously since 1936, and contains articles on China philately as well as society business and schedules of upcoming events.

The society owns the rights to the Ma Stamp Catalogue and is currently working on an updated edition

Meritorious Service Award
In 1995, the society’s Meritorious Service Award was established and is awarded to members of the society who, through their meritorious work, have enhanced the goals of the society.

See also
China Philatelic Society of London
Postage stamps and postal history of China
Postage stamps and postal history of Hong Kong
Postage stamps and postal history of Taiwan

References
 The China Stamp Society, Inc.

Philatelic organizations based in the United States
Philately of China
Philately of Tibet